Allen's woodrat (Hodomys alleni) is a species of rodent in the family Cricetidae.

It is the only species in the genus Hodomys.

Distribution
This woodrat species is endemic to Mexico.

It is native from southern Sinaloa to Oaxaca states. It is found in interior México in the basins of the Río Balsas of central Puebla and Río Tehuacán of northern Oaxaca.

Its natural habitat is subtropical or tropical dry shrubland.

References

Musser, G. G. and M. D. Carleton. 2005. Superfamily Muroidea. pp. 894–1531 in Mammal Species of the World a Taxonomic and Geographic Reference. D. E. Wilson and D. M. Reeder eds. Johns Hopkins University Press, Baltimore.

Neotominae
Endemic mammals of Mexico
woodrat, Allens
Natural history of Oaxaca
Natural history of Puebla
Natural history of Sinaloa
Near threatened fauna of North America
Mammals described in 1892
Taxonomy articles created by Polbot
Taxa named by Clinton Hart Merriam
Sinaloan dry forests
Jalisco dry forests
Fauna of the Southern Pacific dry forests